"Epitaph to a Dog" (also sometimes referred to as "Inscription on the Monument to a Newfoundland Dog") is a poem by the British poet Lord Byron. It was written in 1808 in honour of his Newfoundland dog, Boatswain, who had just died of rabies.  When Boatswain contracted the disease, Byron reportedly nursed him without any fear of becoming bitten and infected. The poem is inscribed on Boatswain's tomb, which is larger than Byron's, at Newstead Abbey,  Byron's estate.

The sections above the poem form a memorial eulogy to Boatswain, and introduce the poem. Though often assumed to form part of the poem, they were written not by Byron but by his friend John Hobhouse. A letter of 1830 by Hobhouse suggests that Byron had planned to use the last two lines of his poem by way of an introductory inscription, but found he preferred Hobhouse's comparison of the attributes of dogs and people.

Text

Renovation

The tomb underwent renovations in 1987.

References

Poetry by Lord Byron
1808 poems